USS Octorara was a steamer acquired by the Union Navy during the American Civil War. She was used by the Navy to patrol navigable waterways of the Confederacy to prevent the Confederates from trading with other countries.

Built at the Brooklyn Navy Yard 

Octorara was launched by the Brooklyn Navy Yard 7 December 1861, sponsored by Miss Emma Hartt, daughter of Naval Constructor E. Hartt; and commissioned 28 February 1862, Lt. George Brown in command.

Civil War service

Assigned to the North Atlantic Blockade 

The new double-ended, side-wheel steamer departed New York City 17 March 1862 and served briefly on blockade duty with the North Atlantic Blockading Squadron before reporting to Commander David D. Porter at Ship Island, Mississippi.

Reassigned to the Mississippi River action at Vicksburg 

She acted as flagship for David Dixon Porter's Mortar Flotilla during Flag Officer David Farragut's expedition up the Mississippi River to attack Vicksburg, Mississippi. Before dawn 28 June, Porter's ships opened fire on the Confederate fortress and shelled the southern batteries while Farragut dashed by the river stronghold.

At the height of the fight, Octorara became unmanageable when her wheel ropes jammed. She drifted down stream into 's line of fire. She was damaged when shells from the steam sloop of war burst off her port beam.

Repaired at Baltimore and returned to the East Coast blockade 

On 24 July, en route to Baltimore, Maryland, for repairs, she captured Tubal Cain east of Savannah, Georgia, as the British blockade running steamer tried to slip into Charleston, South Carolina, with munitions.
 
Back in top fighting trim early in September, Octorara, commanded by Comdr. During the ensuing year she captured nine Confederate and British blockade runners.

West Gulf Blockading Squadron operations 

On 11 September 1863 Lt. Comdr. W. W. Low relieved Comdr. Collins of command of Octorara. Arriving New Orleans, Louisiana, 19 October 1863, the steamer joined the West Gulf Blockading Squadron. From November to March 1864, she assisted in the blockade of Mobile, Alabama, bombarding Fort Powell at the entrance to Mississippi Sound 16–29 February.

On 5 August Octorara participated in the Battle of Mobile Bay, passing Fort Morgan lashed to Brooklyn. Farragut's squadron drove past the forts into the bay, engaged and captured the Confederate ram  and the gunboat . Octorara received 17 hits during the engagement. Her casualties numbered 1 killed and 10 wounded. She continued to operate in the vicinity of Mobile until July 1865, firing on fortifications and taking part in the capture of the city 12 April 1865.

Post-war decommissioning and sale 

Octorara sailed 20 July arriving New York City the 29th, decommissioned 5 August 1865 and was sold 9 November 1866.

References

External links 

 Pictures of USS Octorara

Ships of the Union Navy
Ships built in Brooklyn
Steamships of the United States Navy
Gunboats of the United States Navy
American Civil War patrol vessels of the United States
1861 ships